The St. Ignatius Jacobite Syrian Church, Kanjiramattom was founded and established on 2 August 1879 by Malankara Metropolitan Mor Dionysius Joseph Pulikottil. The church is part of an ancient church called ‘Syriac Orthodox Church of Antioch’, one of the members of Oriental Orthodox Church family.

The church supreme head is Patriarch of Antioch Moran Mor Ignatius Aphrem II. The head of the church in Malankara is the Catholicose of the East, Aboon Mor Baselios Thomas I. The church is part of Kochi Diocese headed by Metropolitan Dr. Joseph Mor Gregorios.

St. Ignatius Jacobite Syrian church is the home parish for Rev. (Dr.) Kurien Arch Corepiscopa, Kaniyamparambil. He is the only priest in the history of the Universal Syrian Orthodox Church with title Reesh Corepiscopo (arch Corepiscopo). He is famous for his translation of Holy Bible "Visudha Grantham" - the official Bible of the Jacobite Syrian Orthodox Church.

Organizations 

St. Ignatius High School, Kanjiramattom
St. Ignatius Higher Secondary School, Kanjiramattom
St. Ignatius Vocational Higher Secondary School, Kanjiramattom

References

Christian clergy from Kochi
Syriac Orthodox churches in India
Churches in Ernakulam district
Churches completed in 1879
19th-century churches in India
19th-century Oriental Orthodox church buildings